Statistics of J. League Cup, officially the 2001 J.League Yamazaki Nabisco Cup, in the 2001 season.

Overview
It was contested by 28 teams, and Yokohama F. Marinos won the championship.

Results

1st round
The first legs were played on 4 April, and the second legs were played on 18 April. 12 teams from the Division 1 and all 12 teams from the Division 2 entered this round.

|}
1st Leg

2nd Leg

2nd round
The first legs were played on 13 June, and the second legs were played on 20 June. The 4 remaining teams from the Division 1 entered this round.

|}
1st Leg

2nd Leg

Quarterfinals
The first legs were played on 8 August, and the second legs were played from 22 to 29 August.

|}
1st Leg

2nd Leg

Semifinals
The first legs were played on 26 September, and the second legs were played on 10 October.

|}
1st Leg

2nd Leg

Final

Yokohama F. Marinos won the championship.

References
rsssf
 J. League

J.League Cup
League Cup